River Dulais is a river of Wales which has its source at Mynydd y Drum.  It joins the River Neath after flowing over Aberdulais Falls.

External links
Angling News Weekly - River Dulais

Dulais Valley
Rivers of Neath Port Talbot